The Grove is a historic home located near Hanover, Caroline County, Virginia.  The original main house was built about 1787, and expanded to its present size about 1800.  The main section is a -story, three bay, frame dwelling with a central hall plan. It stands on a small brick foundation and has a gable roof. The 19th and 20th centuries saw the construction of additions. Also on the property are a contributing smokehouse, water tower (c. 1920), tobacco barn, family cemetery, and site of an icehouse.

It was listed on the National Register of Historic Places in 2009.

References

Houses on the National Register of Historic Places in Virginia
Houses completed in 1787
Houses in Caroline County, Virginia
National Register of Historic Places in Caroline County, Virginia
1787 establishments in Virginia